Globba is a genus of plants in the ginger family. It contains about 100 species, native to China, the Indian Subcontinent, Southeast Asia, New Guinea, the Bismarck Archipelago and Queensland.

Species

Plants of the World Online includes:

 Globba acehensis A.Takano & H.Okada - Sumatra
 Globba adhaerens Gagnep. - Indochina
 Globba albiflora Ridl. - Indochina
 Globba albobracteata N.E.Br. - Sumatra
 Globba andersonii C.B.Clarke ex Baker in J.D.Hooker - eastern Himalayas
 Globba angcorensis Gagnep. - Cambodia, Vietnam
 Globba annamensis Gagnep. - Laos, Vietnam
 Globba argyrocycnos Sangvir. & M.F.Newman
 Globba arracanensis Kurz - northern Myanmar
 Globba atrosanguinea Teijsm. & Binn. - Sumatra, Borneo
 Globba aurantiaca Miq. - Sumatra
 Globba aurea Elmer - Palawan, Busuanga
 Globba bicolor Gagnep. - Cambodia, Vietnam
 Globba brachyanthera K.Schum. - Sumatra, Borneo
 Globba bracteolata Wall. ex Baker in J.D.Hooker - Bangladesh, Assam, Myanmar
 Globba brevifolia (K.Schum.) K.Schum. in H.G.A.Engler - Luzon
 Globba cambodgensis Gagnep. - Cambodia, Vietnam, Thailand
 Globba campsophylla K.Schum. in H.G.A.Engler  - Philippines
 Globba candida Gagnep. - Cambodia
 Globba cernua Baker in J.D.Hooker - Myanmar, Thailand, Malaysia, Sumatra
 Globba chekiangensis G.Y.Li, Z.H.Chen & G.H.Xia - Zhejiang
 Globba clarkei Baker in J.D.Hooker - Nepal, Sikkim, Bhutan, Assam, Arunachal Pradesh, Bangladesh, Thailand 
 Globba colpicola K.Schum. in H.G.A.Engler - Thailand
 Globba corneri A.A.Weber - Malaysia
 Globba curtisii Holttum - Malaysia
 Globba emeiensis Z.Y.Zhu - Sichuan
 Globba fecunda A.Takano & H.Okada - Sumatra
 Globba flagellaris K.Larsen - Thailand
 Globba flavibracteata A.Takano & H.Okada - Sumatra
 Globba fragilis S.N.Lim - Thailand, Langkawi
 Globba franciscii Ridl. - Sabah, Sarawak
 Globba garrettii Kerr - Thailand
 Globba geoffrayi Gagnep. - Cambodia
 Globba glandulosa Ridl. - Sarawak
 Globba globulifera Gagnep.  - Thailand, Vietnam
 Globba gracilis K.Schum. in H.G.A.Engler - Mindanao
 Globba hasseltii Boerl. in A.L.van Hasselt - Sumatra
 Globba holttumii S.N.Lim - Malaysia
 Globba insectifera Ridl. - Myanmar
 Globba integra Ridl.  - Thailand
 Globba × intermedia S.N.Lim - Malaysia (G. cernua × G. patens)
 Globba keithii Ridl.  - Thailand
 Globba kerrii Craib  - Myanmar, Thailand
 Globba laeta K.Larsen - Myanmar, Thailand
 Globba lancangensis Y.Y.Qian - Yunnan
 Globba latifolia Ridl. - Philippines
 Globba leucantha Miq. - Thailand, Malaysia, Sumatra
 Globba leucocarpa Ridl. - Philippines
 Globba macrocarpa Gagnep. - Indochina
 Globba macroclada Gagnep. - Nepal, eastern Himalayas
 Globba maculata Blume - Java
 Globba marantina L. - widespread through the Indian Subcontinent and Southeast Asia (Indochina, Malaysia, Indonesia, Philippines, etc.) as well as Yunnan, New Guinea, the Bismarck Archipelago, and Mer ( = Murray Island in Queensland)
 Globba menglianensis Y.Y.Qian - Yunnan
 Globba merrilli Ridl. - Luzon
 Globba mogokensis W.W.Sm. & Banerji - Myanmar
 Globba multiflora Wall. ex Baker in J.D.Hooker - Assam, Bangladesh, eastern Himalayas, Myanmar
 Globba multifolia A.Takano & H.Okada - Sumatra
 Globba muluensis R.M.Sm. - Borneo
 Globba nawawii Ibrahim & K.Larsen - Terengganu
 Globba nisbetiana Craib - Thailand
 Globba nuda K.Larsen - Thailand
 Globba obscura K.Larsen - Thailand
 Globba orixensis Roxb. - Bangladesh, eastern India, Myanmar
 Globba paniculata Valeton - Sumatra
 Globba parva Gagnep. - Indochina
 Globba parviflora C.Presl - Philippines
 Globba patens Miq. - Thailand, Malaysia, Sumatra
 Globba pauciflora King ex Baker in J.D.Hooker - Myanmar, Andaman & Nicobar Islands
 Globba pendula Roxb. - Assam, Bangladesh, Sri Lanka, Indochina, western Indonesia, Malaysia, Andaman Islands
 Globba platystachya Baker in J.D.Hooker - southern India
 Globba praecox K.J.Williams & Paisooks. - Thailand
 Globba propinqua Ridl. - Borneo
 Globba pumila Ridl. - Sarawak
 Globba purpurascens Craib - Thailand
 Globba pyramidata Gagnep. - Cambodia, Vietnam, Mindanao
 Globba racemosa Sm. - Himalayas, southern China, Myanmar, Thailand
 Globba radicalis Roxb. - eastern Himalayas
 Globba rahmanii Yusof - Bangladesh
 Globba ranongensis Picheans. & Tiyaw. - Thailand
 Globba reflexa Craib - Thailand
 Globba rosea Gagnep. - Laos
 Globba schomburgkii Hook.f. - Yunnan, Assam, Indochina
 Globba sessiliflora Sims - India, Myanmar, Thailand
 Globba sherwoodiana W.J.Kress & V.Gowda - Assam, Myanmar
 Globba siamensis (Hemsl.) Hemsl. - Thailand, Laos, Cambodia
 Globba spathulata Roxb. - eastern Himalayas
 Globba subscaposa Collett & Hemsl. - Myanmar
 Globba substrigosa King ex Baker in J.D.Hooker - Myanmar, Thailand
 Globba talangensis A.Takano & H.Okada - Sumatra
 Globba tembatensis Y.Y.Sam & Julius - Malaysia
 Globba thorelii Gagnep. - Thailand, Vietnam, Cambodia
 Globba tricolor Ridl. - Borneo
 Globba unifolia Ridl. - Malaysia, Thailand
 Globba urophylla K.Schum. in H.G.A.Engler  - Maluku
 Globba ustulata Gagnep. - Balabac, Vietnam
 Globba variabilis Ridl. - Thailand, Malaysia, Sumatra
 Globba wardii (B.L.Burtt & R.M.Sm.) K.J.Williams - Mizoram, Myanmar
 Globba wengeri (C.E.C.Fisch.) K.J.Williams - Assam, Myanmar
 Globba winitii C.H.Wright - Thailand, Myanmar
 Globba xantholeuca Craib - Thailand
 Globba yeatsiana Craib - Thailand

References

External links

 Pacific Bulb Society, Globba photos of several species
 Floridata, Globba winitii, Common Names: dancing ladies ginger, dancing girls ginger
 Dave's Garden, PlantFiles: Dancing Girl Ginger Globba schomburgkii
 National Tropical Botanical Garden (USA), Globba atrosanguinea

Zingiberoideae
Zingiberaceae genera